is a Japanese former swimmer, who specialized in backstroke events. He collected a total of three silver medals in the 200 m backstroke at the Universiade (2003 in Daegu, 2005 in Izmir, and 2007 in Bangkok). Nakano is also a graduate at Hosei University in Tokyo.

Nakano made his international debut at the 2002 Asian Games in Busan, South Korea, where he earned a silver medal in the 200 m backstroke, clocking at 2:00.78.

At the 2005 FINA World Championships in Montreal, Quebec, Canada, Nakano broke a two-minute barrier, but rounded out the final field in last place by 0.17 of a second behind Croatia's Gordan Kozulj in 1:58.91. Nakano also lowered his personal best to 1:59.34, but added a bronze to his silver from Busan in the same stroke at the 2006 Asian Games in Doha, Qatar.

Nakano competed for the Japanese squad in the men's 200 m backstroke at the 2008 Summer Olympics in Beijing. Leading up to the Games, he placed second behind Ryosuke Irie at the Olympic trials in Tokyo with a FINA A-standard entry time of 1:58.22. He challenged seven other swimmers on the fourth heat, including Austrian duo Sebastian Stoss and two-time Olympic silver medalist Markus Rogan. Nakano raced to sixth place by a 0.15 of a second behind Stoss in a time of 1:59.59. Nakano missed out the semifinals by 0.65 of a second, as he placed twenty-first overall in the preliminary heats.

At the 2009 FINA World Championships in Rome, Italy, Nakano broke his personal best of 1:57.02 in the 200 m backstroke, but finished only in twelfth place and did not qualify for the final.

References

External links
NBC 2008 Olympics profile

1984 births
Living people
Olympic swimmers of Japan
Swimmers at the 2008 Summer Olympics
Swimmers at the 2002 Asian Games
Swimmers at the 2006 Asian Games
Asian Games medalists in swimming
Japanese male backstroke swimmers
People from Tachikawa
Sportspeople from Tokyo
Asian Games silver medalists for Japan
Asian Games bronze medalists for Japan
Medalists at the 2002 Asian Games
Medalists at the 2006 Asian Games
Universiade medalists in swimming
Universiade silver medalists for Japan
Medalists at the 2003 Summer Universiade
Medalists at the 2005 Summer Universiade
Medalists at the 2007 Summer Universiade
20th-century Japanese people
21st-century Japanese people